Amor a la Mexicana (English: Mexican-style love) is the sixth studio album by Mexican singer Thalía, released on 24 June 1997, by EMI Latin. Recorded in the Crescent Moon Studios, Miami, with producers Emilio Estefan, Kike Santander, Bernardo Ossa, Pablo Flores, Roberto Blades and Javier Garza, the album blends a variety of genres bits of cumbia, salsa, and balladry.

The album received positive reviews upon its release and entered in the top 10 of both Top Latin Albums and Latin Pop Albums, being certified two times platinum by RIAA. The album has been regarded as one of the singer's best releases to date, especially for the album's first single "Amor a la Mexicana", which showcased the evolution of Thalía as a musician. It is one of Thalía's best selling albums to date with over two million copies sold worldwide, becoming in one of the best-selling "Latin" albums. Amor a la Mexicana is also one of the best-selling releases in Chile. According to Luca Villa from Billboard, Thalía helped to globalize and popularize Mexican culture with this album.

Production and promotion
Following the success of Thalía's fourth studio album, En éxtasis (1995), EMI Latin planned the release of a new album by Thalía. Recording sessions started in 1996 and the investment for the promotion of the album would be around 1.5 million dollars. The album would be released worldwide in 1997 but in some countries like Brazil it was released in 1998. For the Brazilian edition three songs in Portuguese were recorded and added as bonus tracks. In France, the album was titled Por Amor and was released with a different cover artwork.

Thalía visited many countries to promote her album including: Perú, Puerto Rico, Venezuela, Italy, France, Philippines, Germany, Belgium, Ecuador, Argentina, Brazil, Chile, China, United Kingdom, El Salvador, Bolivia, Spain, Portugal, Indonesia, Lebanon, Finland, Austria and the United States.

Singles
"Amor a la Mexicana" was released as the album's lead single, it became one of Thalia's biggest international hits and is widely recognized as one of her signature songs. A remixed version called "Cuca's Fiesta Mix" was included in some editions of the album and a banda version was included in Thalía's compilation album Thalía con banda: Grandes éxitos (2001), the three versions have their own music video.

"Por Amor" was released as the second single of the album, the music video was released in two different versions, directed by Gustavo Garzon, the original album version and the "Primera Vez Remix" version, both first aired in late 1997. It was the 55th most played song in Romania in 1999. The song also received radio airplay in Spain.

The third single was "Mujer Latina" it was released as "Vengo! Vengo! (Mujer Latina)" in Europe. It has two videos, and it was directed by Gustavo Garzon. The song had airplay success in Latin American radio stations and reached the top spot in Chile. The song reached number two in Guatemala.

The fourth single of the album was "Noches Sin Luna" it was released in early 1998 and a Portuguese version of the song was included as a bonus track in the Brazilian edition.

"Ponle Remedio" was Released in 1998 as the fifth single and presented in television programs and radios stations as advertisement.

"Es Tu Amor" was released as the sixth single, it was also included in the soundtrack of the movie Ever After. Thalia presented the song live during concerts and performed in several events. De Dónde Soy was released as the seventh and final single from the album only in Spain and Latin America. A Portuguese version of the song ("De onde sou") was also released and was included in the Brazilian edition of the album.

Two promotional singles were released: "Dicen Por Ahí" which was released at the same time of "De dónde soy" which received airplay in Spain and later performed on Thalía's soap opera Rosalinda in 1999. The song "Echa Pa'lante" that was included in the Dance with Me movie soundtrack in an English version and the original version was performed in Thalía's soap opera Rosalinda. The version in the movie is completely different from the original song, even changing its message. The original song, in this album, was a political protest song against the ruling PRI in the 1997 Mexican parliamentary elections.

Critical reception

The album was praised by music critics. Jason Birchmeier from AllMusic website gave the album four out of five stars and called the album's production "predictably excellent". He also wrote that the album has "songs with compelling, appropriately mexicana lyrics and catchy, singalong hooks" and that it includes "very few, if any, dull moments". He conclude that "Amor a la Mexicana is a sort of timeless album".

Commercial performance
The album had major success in Latin America, the U.S., Spain, France, Philippines and other European countries. In Spain the sales of the album increased from 10,000 copies to 150,000 after a visit from the singer in the country where she appeared in several TV spots. As of 1998, Amor a la Mexicana sold 93,000 units in Argentina and was later certified with two times Platinum denoting sales of over 120,000 copies. In Chile, it sold over 70,000 copies as of 2000 and is listed as one of the best-selling albums there. In 2000, when she was promoting her album Arrasando in Greece, she received 2 gold records, one for Arrasando and another for Amor a la Mexicana.

According to Billboard magazine Amor a la Mexicana is a multimillion seller. It sold over 2 million copies worldwide, and is considered "Thalía's best selling album" according to The New York Times.

Track listing

Charts

Weekly charts

Year-end charts

Certifications and sales

See also
 List of best-selling albums in Chile
 List of best-selling Latin albums

References 

1997 albums
Thalía albums
EMI Latin albums
Spanish-language albums
Albums produced by Emilio Estefan
Albums produced by Kike Santander